Salif Coulibaly (born 13 May 1988) is a Malian footballer who plays for Horoya AC, as a central defender.

Club career
Born in Bamako, Coulibaly has played for Djoliba, Esteghlal Khuzestan, TP Mazembe and Al Ahly. In January he was set to move to Iraqi club Al-Shorta, but the move was called off.

International career
Coulibaly made his international debut for Mali in 2012.

References

External links
Salif Coulibaly at Footballdatabase

1988 births
Living people
Sportspeople from Bamako
Malian footballers
Mali international footballers
Djoliba AC players
Esteghlal Khuzestan players
TP Mazembe players
Al Ahly SC players
Raja CA players
Horoya AC players
Azadegan League players
Linafoot players
Egyptian Premier League players
Association football defenders
2013 Africa Cup of Nations players
2015 Africa Cup of Nations players
2017 Africa Cup of Nations players
Malian expatriate footballers
Malian expatriate sportspeople in Iran
Expatriate footballers in Iran
Malian expatriate sportspeople in the Democratic Republic of the Congo
Expatriate footballers in the Democratic Republic of the Congo
Malian expatriate sportspeople in Egypt
Expatriate footballers in Egypt
Malian expatriate sportspeople in Iraq
Expatriate footballers in Iraq
21st-century Malian people